Haciye Hoşyar Kadın ("pleasant lover"; died  1859) was a consort of Sultan Mahmud II of the Ottoman Empire.

Early life
Hoşyar Kadın was educated in the house of Beyhan Sultan, daughter of Sultan Mustafa III, and cousin of the Sultan Mahmud and she was called her "spiritual daughter". She was tall and blonde, with pale skin.

Marriage
In 1811, Beyhan Sultan gave a grand banquet to Mahmud. During this time, he asked to have Hoşyar as consort. Beyhan consented to his offer and, after some days, sent her to the imperial harem, with a grand ceremony, and with magnificent presents, which she gave her as her dower. For ten days, the Sultan was most assiduous in his attentions.

She was given the title of Fourth Consort. After nine months, on 29 June 1812, she gave birth to her first daughter, Mihrimah Sultan. She was followed three years later by another daughter, Zeynep Sultan, born on 18 April 1815, who died at the age of ten months on February 1816. Hoşyar was then elevated first to Third Consort, and later to Second Consort.

When the time came to get Mihrimah Sultan a husband, Hoşyar resolved that she should make her choice. She showed her the portraits of several young men, each worthy of her hand. Mihrimah chose Said Pasha, and the two married in 1835.

Shortly after his marriage to her daughter, Said Pasha incurred Mahmud's displeasure and was exiled to the provinces, to his wife's and mother-in-law's distress. At this time, Hoşyar was sufficiently sure of her influence to petition Mahmud directly and did so in a letter. She followed this up with two letters of thanks, one when Mahmud granted her request and ordered Said Pasha brought back to Istanbul, the other when he arrived.

Mihrimah died in 1838 in childbirth, and with her, Hoşyar's last solace disappeared. With the death of Mahmud in 1839, she lost her influence at court.

Widowhood
In later years she settled in her palace, situated at Tarlabaşı, facing Dolmabahçe Palace. She met Melek Hanim, wife of grand vizier Kıbrıslı Mehmed Emin Pasha. Melek described her as tall and fair-haired, and her skin, exceedingly white, set off the freshness of her complexion. Melek also stressed that Hoşyar was gifted with a lively spirit and a rare intelligence, but that nevertheless she was bored by the monotony of her life. Knowing that Melek had been in Europe, Hoşyar interrogated her as to the manners and customs of the Christians, the way the towns were built, the balls, theatres, systems of lighting by gas, the architecture of the palaces, and a thousand other matters.

Bezmiâlem Sultan, the mother of Sultan Abdulmejid I always regarded her with a jealous eye. She scarcely allowed her to receive, once a month, a visit from Said Pasha when he was in Istanbul. Moreover, she was never allowed to hear of her daughter.

In 1840, she commissioned a fountain in Elhac, Kasımpaşa. In 1844, she commissioned a school in Burgaz. She also commissioned a mosque.

Death
In 1859, Hoşyar went for a pilgrimage (Hajj) to Mecca, where she earned the name "Haciye" and where she died in the same year. She was buried there.

Issue
Together with Mahmud, Hoşyar had two daughters:
 Mihrimah Sultan (Topkapı Palace, 10 June 1812 - Istanbul, Turkey, 3 July 1838, buried in Nakşidil Sultan Mausoleum). She married once at had a son.
 Zeynep Sultan (18 April 1815 - February 1816). Buried in the Nurosmaniye mosque.

In popular culture
In 2018 Turkish historical fiction TV series Kalbimin Sultanı, Hoşyar is portrayed by Turkish actress Beste Kökdemir.

See also
Ottoman Imperial Harem
List of consorts of the Ottoman sultans

References

Sources
 
 
  

Year of birth unknown
1859 deaths
19th-century consorts of Ottoman sultans